Irina of Russia may refer to:

Irina Godunova, tsarina of tsar Fyodor I Ivanovich and sister of tsar Boris Godunov
Tsarevna Irina Mikhailovna of Russia, eldest daughter of tsar Mikhail Fyodorovich
Princess Irina Alexandrovna of Russia, only daughter of Grand Duke Alexander Mikhailovich and Grand Duchess Xenia Alexandrovna

See also 
Irina Romanova (disambiguation)